Christina Maria Booth (born 1965) is a Welsh progressive rock vocalist and singer-songwriter.

Since its inception in 2001, she has been the lead vocalist for the Welsh progressive rock band Magenta, in which she collaborates with Rob Reed.

Before that, she collaborated with Reed as part of Trippa and also his project Cyan.  She has previously been credited under her maiden name as Christina Murphy, and now often is credited simply as Christina.

References

1965 births
Living people
Women rock singers
21st-century Welsh women singers
Welsh rock singers
Welsh women singer-songwriters